Kirby Snead (born Kirby Chuck; October 7, 1994) is an American professional baseball pitcher for the Oakland Athletics of Major League Baseball (MLB). He made his MLB debut in 2021 for the Toronto Blue Jays.

Amateur career
Snead attended Santa Fe High School in his hometown of Alachua, Florida. Undrafted out of high school, he then attended the University of Florida, and played three seasons for the Florida Gators. In his freshman season, Snead appeared in 32 games and pitched to a 3–0 win–loss record, 2.40 earned run average (ERA), and 22 strikeouts in 41 innings. As a sophomore, Snead went 1–0 in 28 games played, and posted a 3.15 ERA and 33 strikeouts in 34 innings pitched. In his final season with the Gators, Snead made a NCAA-leading 41 relief appearances, and in 35 innings went 3–1 with a 2.78 ERA and 33 strikeouts.

Professional baseball

Minor leagues
The Toronto Blue Jays selected Snead in the tenth round of the 2016 Major League Baseball draft. He received a $125,000 signing bonus and was assigned to the Advanced-A Dunedin Blue Jays. After a single appearance for Dunedin he was assigned to the Class-A Lansing Lugnuts, where he finished the 2016 season. In 14 total relief appearances, Snead went 0–1 with a 3.62 ERA and 18 strikeouts in 27 innings. He began the 2017 season with Lansing, and was promoted to Dunedin in mid-June. Snead ended 2017 with a 7–2 record, 1.79 ERA, and 56 strikeouts in 42 appearances, and did not yield a home run. In 2018, Snead played with Dunedin and the Double-A New Hampshire Fisher Cats, pitching 51 total innings and posting a 4–5 record, 3.88 ERA, and 51 strikeouts.

Snead continued to progress through the minor league ranks in 2019, appearing for New Hampshire briefly to begin the season before being promoted to the Triple-A Buffalo Bisons. He went 7–2 with a 3.45 ERA and 68 strikeouts in 62 innings between the two teams. The 2020 minor league season was cancelled due the COVID-19 pandemic, and Snead did not play professional baseball at any level that year. He began the 2021 minor league season with the Bisons, and had posted a 2.01 ERA through 31 innings before being called-up.

Toronto Blue Jays
Snead made his Major League debut on July 28, 2021, against the Boston Red Sox retiring the only two hitters he faced. He finished the season with a 2.35 ERA and 7 strikeouts in 7.2 innings.

Oakland Athletics
On March 16, 2022, the Blue Jays traded Snead, Gunnar Hoglund, Kevin Smith, and Zach Logue to the Oakland Athletics for Matt Chapman.

References

External links

1994 births
Living people
Baseball players from Florida
Buffalo Bisons (minor league) players
Dunedin Blue Jays players
Florida Gators baseball players
Lansing Lugnuts players
Major League Baseball pitchers
New Hampshire Fisher Cats players
Oakland Athletics players
People from Alachua, Florida
Toronto Blue Jays players